Anže Semenič (born 1 August 1993) is a Slovenian former ski jumper who competed at World Cup level from 2013 to 2022.

Career 
Semenič won the 2014–15 Continental Cup overall title. He made his World Cup debut in 2013. As part of the Slovenian team, he won his first World Cup competition in the team event in Planica in March 2015. He celebrated his first Grand Prix win at Nizhny Tagil in 2016. He won his first individual World Cup event in Zakopane in the 2017–18 season.

World Cup

Standings

Individual wins

Individual starts

References

External links 

1993 births
Living people
Sportspeople from Kranj
Slovenian male ski jumpers
Ski jumpers at the 2018 Winter Olympics
Olympic ski jumpers of Slovenia
21st-century Slovenian people